Eishō or Eisho may refer to:
Eishō (Heian period) (永承), Japanese era from 1046 to 1053
Eishō (Muromachi period) (永正), Japanese era from 1504 to 1521
Empress Eishō (英照), empress consort of Emperor Kōmei of Japan
Chōkōsai Eishō, (fl. 1795–1801), Japanese artist
Eisho Higa, singer